Gortloney ( or ) is a townland in the parish of Moylagh, County Meath, Ireland. 

Townlands of County Meath